Private Michael Crowley (1829 – May 12, 1888) was an American soldier who fought in the American Civil War. Crowley received the country's highest award for bravery during combat, the Medal of Honor, for his action during the Battle of Waynesboro in Virginia on 2 March 1865. He was honored with the award on 26 March 1865.

Biography
Crowley was born in Rochester, New York in 1829. He enlisted into the 22nd New York Cavalry. He died on 12 May 1888.

Medal of Honor citation

See also

List of American Civil War Medal of Honor recipients: A–F

References

1829 births
1888 deaths
People of New York (state) in the American Civil War
Union Army soldiers
United States Army Medal of Honor recipients
American Civil War recipients of the Medal of Honor